Benji Whelan is a Gaelic football manager. He managed his native Waterford between 2018 and 2020.

He is from Kilmacthomas.

He led The Nire to two Munster Senior Club Football Championship finals (2014 and 2016).

References

Year of birth missing (living people)
Living people
Gaelic football managers